Justinian Lancaster (born c. 1524) was  an English Anglican priest in the 16th century.

Lancaster was educated at Corpus Christi College, Oxford, where he was admitted in 1541 and became a fellow in 1545. He held livings at Enmore, Huish Champflower, Chawton, Donyatt, Yatton and Churchstanton. Lancaster was Archdeacon of Taunton from 1560 until 1584, when he was appointed a prebendary of Wells Cathedral.

Notes

16th-century English Anglican priests
Archdeacons of Taunton
Alumni of Corpus Christi College, Oxford